Mark Buben (born March 23, 1957) is a former American football defensive end. He played for the New England Patriots in 1979 and 1981 and for the Cleveland Browns in 1982.

References

1957 births
Living people
American football defensive ends
Tufts Jumbos football players
New England Patriots players
Cleveland Browns players
Chicago Blitz players
Arizona Wranglers players
Arizona Outlaws players
Denver Gold players